Atmospheric Science Letters is a monthly peer-reviewed open access scientific journal covering the atmospheric sciences. It was established in 2000 and is published by John Wiley & Sons on behalf of the Royal Meteorological Society, of which it is the official journal. The editor-in-chief are Rebecca Hemingway and Andrea Montani. According to the Journal Citation Reports, the journal has a 2020 impact factor of 2.415, ranking it 57th out of 94 journals in the category "Meteorology & Atmospheric Sciences". Paul Hardaker is the founding editor.

References

External links

Publications established in 2000
Monthly journals
Wiley (publisher) academic journals
Royal Meteorological Society academic journals
Academic journals associated with learned and professional societies of the United Kingdom
Meteorology journals